Khanwa (also spelt Khanua) is a village in Bharatpur District of Rajasthan, lying about 35 km from city of Bharatpur, the district headquarter, 60 km west of the city of Agra in India. It was the site of A Historic Battle in the history of North India, and a few miles from Fatehpur Sikri.

History
The Battle of Khanua was fought on March 17, (1527), between Babur, founder of the Mughal empire in India on the one hand and Rajput army led by Rana Sanga, king of Mewar, on the other.

References

Villages in Bharatpur district
History of Uttar Pradesh
Historic sites in India